At the 1930 British Empire Games, the boxing competition was held in Hamilton, Ontario, Canada, and featured contests in eight weight classes.

Medal summary

Results
Flyweight
 semi final - Pardoe bt Galloway on points
Final - Smith bt Pardoe on points

Bantamweight
 semi final - Mizler bt Holt (stopped in 2nd round)
Final - Mizler bt Keller on points

Featherweight
2nd Rd - Meacham bt Paul Mecteau (Canada) on points
semi final - Meacham bt Lyons on points
semi final - Stevens bt Lafosse (Newfoundland) on points
Final - Meacham by Stevens on points

Lightweight
semi final - Rowland bt Love on points
 Final - Rowland bt Canzano on points

Welterweight
 semi final - Hall bt Brooman on points
 Final - Hall bt Williams on points

Middleweight
 semi final - Mallin bt E Phillips (Canada) on points
 semi final - Gallagher bt Peirce on split decision 2-1
 Final - Mallin bt Gallagher on points

Light heavyweight
 semi final - Goyder bt Basson on points
 Final - Goyder bt Pitcher on points

Heavyweight
 Final - Signaller Stuart bt Skimming (skimming retired after round 2)

References

Commonwealth Games Medallists - Boxing. GBR Athletics. Retrieved on 2010-07-21.

1930 British Empire Games events
1930
1930 in sports
International boxing competitions hosted by Canada